Freddie Eugene (a.k.a. Fredrik Lindgren) (born February 1, 1971) a Stockholm born Swedish musician, currently fronts the Stockholm based band Atlantic Tide. He played guitar and composed music / lyrics in various Swedish bands, including Unleashed, Loud Pipes, Terra Firma, Celestial Pain, Born of Fire and the recently disbanded Harms Way. He currently resides in Stockholm.

Discography

Unleashed
 1991: Where No Life Dwells
 1992: Shadows in the Deep
 1993: Across the Open Sea
 1993: Live in Vienna '93
 1995: Victory
 1995: Eastern Blood, Hail to Poland (Live)
Loud Pipes
 1995: Drunk Forever
 1997: The Down Hill Blues
Terra Firma
 1999: Terra Firma
 2001: Harms Way
Harms Way
 2006: Oxytocin

References

External links
Official Atlantic Tide Myspace
Official Harms Way Myspace
Personal Myspace

Swedish songwriters
1971 births
Living people
Swedish heavy metal guitarists
21st-century guitarists